Flag Day is a day to fly a flag of a certain area or a day set aside to honor an event specifically involving a national flag.

Flag Day may also refer to:

National days

 Flag Day (Albania)
 Flag Day (Argentina)
 Flag Day (Australia)
 National Flag of Canada Day
 Armed Forces Flag Day, celebrated in India
 Flag Day (Mexico)
 Day of the National Flag (Ukraine)
 Flag Day (United Arab Emirates)
 Flag Day (United States)

Other uses
 Flag day (computing), a large change
 Flag Day (film), a 2021 film by Sean Penn
 Flag Day (Hong Kong), a day for charity fundraising - also practised in Singapore
 "Flag Day" (song), a song by The Housemartins

See also
 Flag flying day
 State Flag Day (disambiguation)